Kendall is an unincorporated community in Shelby County, in the U.S. state of Missouri.

History
A post office called Kendall was established in 1889, and remained in operation until 1902. The name may be a transfer from Kendal, in England.

References

Unincorporated communities in Shelby County, Missouri
Unincorporated communities in Missouri